Calathus fracassii is a species of ground beetle from the Platyninae subfamily that is endemic to Italy.

References

fracassii
Beetles described in 1908
Endemic fauna of Italy
Beetles of Europe